Heriot Bay is the principal settlement on Quadra Island in British Columbia, Canada.

Heriot Bay hosts a ferry terminal that is used by BC Ferries to sail to and from Whaletown on Cortes Island.
There is also a government dock,  maintained by the Quadra Island Harbour Authority, and the marina at the Heriot Bay Inn. 

It was named for F.L.M. Heriot a relative of Rear-Admiral Sir Thomas Maitland who commanded the Pacific Station from 1860 to 1862.

References 

Designated places in British Columbia
Settlements in British Columbia